Denílson Moraes Lourenço (born May 11, 1977 in Tupã, São Paulo) is a male judoka from Brazil. He won the silver medal in the men's extra-lightweight division (– 48 kg) at the 1999 Pan American Games in Winnipeg, Manitoba, Canada. He represented his native country at the 2000 Summer Olympics in Sydney, Australia.

References
 UOL Profile

External links 
 
 
 
 

1977 births
Living people
Judoka at the 1999 Pan American Games
Judoka at the 2000 Summer Olympics
Judoka at the 2008 Summer Olympics
Olympic judoka of Brazil
Brazilian male judoka
Pan American Games silver medalists for Brazil
Pan American Games medalists in judo
Medalists at the 1999 Pan American Games
21st-century Brazilian people
20th-century Brazilian people
People from Tupã, São Paulo